A civil drawing, or site drawing, is a type of technical drawing that shows information about grading, landscaping, or other site details. These drawings are intended to give a clear picture of all things in a construction site to a civil engineer.

Civil drafters work with civil engineers and other industry professionals to prepare models and drawings for civil engineering projects. Examples of civil engineering projects are bridges, building sites, canals, dams, harbors, roadways, railroads, pipelines, public utility systems, and waterworks. Civil drafters create maps, plans, cross sections, profiles, and detail drawings.

Process 
The very early stages of a civil drawing start with surveying. Surveyors provide a map file of the job site from which civil designers and drafters develop drawings. After the surveying, other departments in the engineering firm start to work on other things such as draining, grading, foundation, and site preparation. Other projects such as electrical, piping, and sewage treatment might require another type of engineering or a specialized design. Final stages of a project may involve finished site preparation and landscape design. This aspect of a project may be contracted to landscape architects.

Standards 

There are different sets of standards for each company, client, government, or professional organizations. For example The Pakistan Society of Mechanical Engineers (PSME) standards might not be the same standards that a client has. But there are also some standards that can be used in any field such as ASME Y14.2 Line Convections and Lettering. Companies often times use standards that published by a professional organization but will add their own standards. Some examples of these standards can be having a different method of saving CADD data or plotting procedures. Government standards are city, county, or federal codes. These standards must always be followed even if the company or professional organization standards are available. Government standards apply even when the government is not the client. Project Standards are the final documents that are used when designing and building a project. These standards can include a combination of different standards from a company, client, or government. Before the drawings get released for bids or construction permitting they must get checked to see if they have all the appropriate standards, this is called standard checking. This process is usually done by a software.

See also 
 Architectural drawing
 Site plan
 Structural drawing
 Working drawing

References 

Technical drawing